Tongue Wash is a wash in Nye County, Nevada, in the United States.

Tongue Wash was likely so named because it is shaped like a tongue.

References

Rivers of Nye County, Nevada
Washes of Nevada